The 2019 season was the Green Bay Packers' 99th in the National Football League (NFL), their 101st overall and their first under new head coach Matt LaFleur. After suffering back-to-back losing seasons for the first time since 1990–91 and missing the playoffs in back-to-back seasons for the first time since 2005–06, the Packers improved on their 6–9–1 record from 2018, finishing 13–3 and returning to the playoffs for the first time since 2016. This guaranteed the Packers' first non-losing season since that same year. Green Bay swept the NFC North for the first time since their franchise-best 2011 season, and achieved their best record since that season as well.

The Packers defeated the Seattle Seahawks 28–23 in the Divisional round of the playoffs, and visited the top-seeded San Francisco 49ers in the NFC Championship Game, where they lost 37–20.

Player movements

Free agents

Trades

Additions

Subtractions

Draft

Draft trades

Washington traded their fourth-round selection to Green Bay in exchange for free safety Ha Ha Clinton-Dix.
Seahawks traded their sixth-round selection to Packers in exchange for quarterback Brett Hundley.

Undrafted free agent additions

Roster cuts
The roster was cut to 53 on August 31, 2019.

Staff

Final roster

Preseason
The Packers' preseason opponents and schedule were announced in the spring.

The preseason week 3 game against the Raiders was in the process of being negotiated; plans were for the game to be held at Investors Group Field in Winnipeg, Manitoba, on August 22 after a scheduling conflict prevented the game from being played at Mosaic Stadium in Regina, Saskatchewan. In the event that the Winnipeg negotiations would have fallen through, the game would be moved to Lambeau Field, effectively giving the Packers an extra home game. On June 5, the IG Field in Winnipeg was confirmed as the host.

Due to holes left in the endzones where the field goals are traditionally anchored in Canadian football, the Packers' third preseason game was played on a modified 80-yard field.

Regular season
On March 25, the NFL announced that the Packers will open their season by playing the Chicago Bears in the  Kickoff Game on Thursday, September 5, with the Bears serving as the home team. The game kicked off at 7:20 p.m. CDT, and was televised by NBC. The full schedule was released on April 17.

Schedule

Note: Intra-division opponents are in bold text.

Game summaries

Week 1: at Chicago Bears
NFL Kickoff Game

Week 2: vs. Minnesota Vikings

Week 3: vs. Denver Broncos

Week 4: vs. Philadelphia Eagles

Week 5: at Dallas Cowboys

The Packers controlled the game early on, establishing a 31–3 lead midway through the third quarter with running back Aaron Jones rushing for four touchdowns and the Packers defense forcing three interceptions off of Cowboys quarterback Dak Prescott. Although the Cowboys attempted to come back late in the game, with the team totaling over 500 yards of total offense and 3 touchdowns, the Packers' lead would prove too much to overcome. With the win, the Packers improved to 4-1 and won their third straight meeting against the Cowboys.

Week 6: vs. Detroit Lions

This Monday Night Football game proved to be highly controversial, due to two highly questionable and controversial hands to the face penalties against Lions defensive end Trey Flowers helped the Packers score in the 4th quarter. Nevertheless, the Packers improved to 5-1 and snapped a 4-game losing streak to the Lions.

Week 7: vs. Oakland Raiders

Quarterback Aaron Rodgers became the first player in Packers history to throw for a perfect passer rating.

Week 8: at Kansas City Chiefs

Week 9: at Los Angeles Chargers

Week 10: vs. Carolina Panthers

Week 12: at San Francisco 49ers

Week 13: at New York Giants

The Packers beat the Giants in the snow to continue their winning streak.

Week 14: vs. Washington Redskins

Week 15: vs. Chicago Bears

With the win, the Packers improved to 11–3. With the victory of the Minnesota Vikings over the Los Angeles Chargers, the Bears were eliminated from post season contention.

Week 16: at Minnesota Vikings

With the win, the Packers advanced to 12–3 and won the NFC North. The Packers also won 12 games for the first time since 2014, and advanced to a record of 12–3 for the first time since 2007.

This was the first regular-season game of Aaron Rodgers' career, and second game overall, where he threw at least one interception and no touchdown passes and won the game. The only other time this occurred was the 2010 NFC Championship Game against the Bears.

Week 17: at Detroit Lions

With the win, the Packers finished the season 13–3, achieving their best record since 2011, and gave the Packers their first division sweep since 2011 as well. They also clinched the #2 seed in the NFC playoffs and earned a first-round bye, although the San Francisco 49ers victory over the Seattle Seahawks prevented them from clinching home-field advantage throughout the playoffs.

Standings

Division

Conference

Postseason

Schedule

Game summaries

NFC Divisional Playoffs: vs. (5) Seattle Seahawks

NFC Championship: at (1) San Francisco 49ers

Statistics

Starters

Regular season
Offense

Defense

Postseason
Offense

Defense

Team leaders

League rankings

Awards

References

External links

Green Bay
Green Bay Packers seasons
Green Bay Packers
NFC North championship seasons